Vengi (or Venginadu) is a delta region spread over the Krishna and Godavari River, (also called Godavari and Krishna districts), the region is also known as Godavari Delta, that used to house world famous diamond mines in the Medieval period. The capital city of Vengi is located at Pedavegi near Eluru. Vengi was the most prominent city in Ancient Andhra for nearly seven centuries. Vengi served as the capital for many Andhra dynasties like Salankayanas, Vishnukundinas, and Eastern Chalukyas. This region was part of Ashoka's Mauryan Empire in the mid-3rd century BCE. After the Mauryan Empire collapsed in 185 BC, the region was dominated by the Satavahanas, who were succeeded in Vengi by the Andhra Ikshvakus. Around 300 CE, the Andhra Ikshvakus were replaced by the Salankayanas. In the late 5th century, the Salankayanas were annexed by the Vishnukundinas. 

King Pulakesin II of the Chalukya conquered Vengi from the Vishnukundinas in the early 7th century and installed his brother Kubja Vishnuvardhana as the viceroy. He eventually established the Eastern Chalukya dynasty. The Eastern Chalukyas were first conquered by the Cholas under Raja Raja Chola I (985–1014) and subsequently became very closely aligned to the Chola empire through marital alliance between the Cholas and the Eastern Chalukyas. This insulated the Eastern Chalukyas from the interference of the Western Chalukyas who sought to make the Eastern Chalukyas as their subordinates. During the reign of the Kulothunga Chola I the Vengi kingdom got absorbed into the Chola empire.

Satavahana period 
The Vengi territory was part of Ashoka's empire and Satavahanas were the Mauryan feudatories administering the area. Following Ashoka's death and the decline of the Mauryas, Satavahana Simuka established the Satavahana dynasty, which came to include even the Magadha and Bengal at its height. The Satavahanas lasted for the next four hundred years after which the Pallavas and Eastern Chalukyas took control of the kingdom.

Vengi Chalukyas 
The Eastern Chalukyas of the 7th and 8th century, were a branch of the Chalukyas of Badami. Pulakesin II, the renowned ruler of Chalukyas conquered Vengi (at a battle near Eluru) in 624 from Vishnukundinas and installed his brother Kubja Vishnuvardhana (624- 641) as its ruler. His dynasty, known as the Eastern Chalukyas, ruled for a century. Vishnuvardhana extended his dominions up to Srikakulam in the north and Nellore in the south. They had faced many wars for the next three centuries from Rashtrakutas and others. The Western Chalukya king Satyashraya tried to amalgamate the two dynasties, but was not successful due to the constant battles with the Paramaras and the Cholas.

To counter the interference of the Western Chalukyas, Rajaraja supported Saktivarman I, an Eastern Chalukya prince who was in exile in the Chola country. He invaded Vengi in 999 to restore Saktivarman to the Eastern Chalukya throne. Saktivarman finally got his throne back in 1002 and consented to recognise the Rajaraja overlordship.

Later Cholas 
Vengi was part of kingdom of Later Cholas during the 12th century. The Western Chalukyas under the king Vikramaditya VI occupied Vengi in 1118, but the Cholas under Vikrama Chola regained Vengi   from Chalukya monarch Someshvara III in 1126–27 with the help of the Velanati Chodas of Tsandavolu.

Later kingdoms 
Between 1135 and 1206, several other minor kingdoms ruled over parts of Andhra Pradesh accepting the authority of the Velanati Cholas. By 1208, Vengi was part of Kakatiya Empire as subordinates to Kakatiyas until their downfall in 1323. later Vengi became part of the Vijayanagara Empire in the 16th century.

Literature 
Vengi has occupied a prominent place in the history of Andhra Pradesh since the time of Eastern Chalukyas. They patronised Telugu. Since the time of the Eastern Chalukya Gunaga Vijayaditya, inscriptions show Telugu prose and poetry, culminating in the production of literary works. Later on, in the 11th century under the patronage of the then Vengi king, Rajaraja Narendra, the great epic, Mahabharata was translated partly by his court poet, Nannaya.

References 

K.A. Nilakanta Sastri, A History of South India (Madras, 1976)
K.A. Nilakanta Sastri, An Advanced History of India (1980)

Regions of India
South India